Shanghai Circus World is a large, permanent indoor circus in the city of Shanghai, China.

Shanghai Circus World covers an area of 22,500 square meters. Its main facility is the Acrobatics Field, in which there are 1,638 seats.

The 100-minute performance show 'ERA Intersection of Time' has been performed since its debut at Shanghai Circus World in September 2005. The show is aided by multimedia including vision, original live music, sound effects, smell effect, air conditioning and lighting. It is unique and comparable to the tradition of the Broadway Musical, a stunning acrobatic show (which has elements performed in the Han Dynasty (206BC–220AD)) combining traditional Chinese arts and modern technologies. The performers present Chinese acrobatics, martial arts and dance in harmony with the music, sound, lighting, and other special effects, which include a water screen. It tells the story of China's evolution from its ancient past to the future is told. The performance provides an insight into China's ancient culture and civilization, with sections about Sinan, an ancient Chinese invention for telling directions, soothsaying and conjuring. With porcelain jars and vats as their stage properties the performers give an overview of Chinese porcelain culture and greater understand of the country's name of 'China'. 
Modern achievements that are also showcased include Shanghai Donghai Cross-Sea Bridge, Maglev Train, and Shenzhou 5, China's first crewed space mission.

Transportation
Shanghai Circus World is on Shanghai Metro Line 1 close to Shanghai Circus World station.

References

Year of establishment missing
Circuses
Performing arts venues in Shanghai

nl:Shanghai Circus World